Infinitum may refer to:

Infinity, the mathematical concept
Infinitum AS, Norwegian recycling operator
Mexican internet provider Infinitum; see Telmex
PowerUp Forever, a video game